Prvoslav Vujcic (born July 20, 1960) is a Serbian Canadian writer, poet, translator, columnist and aphorist. He has been described as one of the most prominent writers of Serbian origin.

Biography

Early life
Vujcic was born on July 20, 1960, in the eastern Serbian city of Požarevac to father Jefrem and mother Nadežda and it was in Požarevac that he completed his elementary education. In 1975, Vujcic enrolled in the Požarevac Gymnasium. That same year, he won the Zmaj Award (awarded annually by the Association of Writers of Serbia for the book of the year) for his collection of poetry titled Pesnik i pesma and the award was presented to him by Desanka Maksimović. In late 1977, he visited Canada for the first time. Vujcic completed his matura and graduated from the Požarevac Gymnasium in 1979. In the early 1980s, he was the leader of the Požarevac section of the Grobari, the supporters group of Partizan Belgrade. In 1983, Vujcic wrote a book of poetry titled Razmišljanja jednog leša which was banned by the Communist government in Yugoslavia by court order in 1983. In 1984, Vujcic was imprisoned in Tuzla for seven days (for his writing and criticizing of Yugoslavia's communist regime) where he wrote his second book of poetry titled Kastriranje vetra which was also banned by the Communist government.

Canada
In January 1987, Vujcic moved to Canada. Upon arrival in Canada, he helped raise funds for the construction of the Church of Saint Sava in Belgrade and the Živojin Mišić monument in Mionica. On June 28, 1989, Vujcic helped organize ceremonies throughout Canada commemorating the 600th anniversary of the Battle of Kosovo. The Canada Gazette wrote about Vujcic and his beginnings in Canada in a 1989 edition. In 1992, he founded the United Serbs FC soccer club for which he and Mike Stojanovic played (as a child, Vujcic played soccer in the youth categories of FK Železničar Požarevac). During this period, Vujcic was a contributor to Serbian magazine Pogledi. In 1999, he was one of the organizers of the Toronto-based demonstrations against the bombing of Yugoslavia. In terms of the Serbian diaspora, the demonstrations lasted all 78 days only in Toronto.

Vujcic is a member of the Association of Writers of Serbia, the Royal Canadian Legion, the Canadian Association of Journalists, the Serbian Literary Guild, the Association of Writers of Republika Srpska and the US-based International Association of Writers. In 2007, the International Association of Writers named him a Poetry Ambassador of the United States. He is also an honourable member of the Desanka Maksimović Serbian Canadian Association. Vujcic is featured in the book Moždana veza sa Srbijom, 100 dragulja srpskog rasejanja (Brain Connection with Serbia, 100 Jewels of the Serbian Diaspora) by Radivoje Petrović. The book features the "one hundred most-known Serbs throughout the world-wide Serbian diaspora." He was featured on the cover of the Ministry of Diaspora of the Republic of Serbia book called U čast pisaca iz rasejanja / In honour of writers in the diaspora in which literary critics Miodrag Perišić and Čedomir Mirković said that "Vujcic is one of the most significant living Serbian poets and dissidents." Vujcic is included in the biographical lexicon Serbian Writers in Diaspora 1914–2014.

Vujcic, nicknamed Pearse after Pádraig Pearse, is the founder of the Urban Book Circle, based in Canada.

Personal life
Vujcic has four children.

Bibliography
Razmišljanja jednog leša (Beogradska knjiga, 2004)
Beograde, dobro je, bi' iz Toronta tebi (Beogradska knjiga, 2004)
Kastriranje vetra (Beogradska knjiga, 2005)
Deveto koleno sve/mira (Beogradska knjiga, 2005)
Wet (UBC Canada Press, 2013)
Repatriates (UBC Canada Press, 2013)
Catching Saliva (UBC Canada Press, 2013)
A Few Good Little Thoughts (UBC Canada Press, 2013)
Thoughts of a Corpse (UBC Canada Press, 2014)
Belgrade, It's All Good (UBC Canada Press, 2014)
Castration of the Wind (UBC Canada Press, 2014)
Ninth Step of the Universe (UBC Canada Press, 2014)
Vlažno (UBC Canada Press, 2014)
Povratnici (UBC Canada Press, 2014)
Hvatanje pljuvačke (UBC Canada Press, 2014)
Nekoliko lepih malih misli (UBC Canada Press, 2014)

References

External links

 

1960 births
Living people
Writers from Požarevac
Serbian male writers
Serbian male poets
Serbian journalists
Serbian monarchists
Serbian anti-communists
Yugoslav dissidents
Eastern Orthodox Christians from Serbia
Eastern Orthodox Christians from Canada
Journalists from Toronto
Writers from Toronto
Exophonic writers
Aphorists
Foundrymen
Prison writings
People with post-traumatic stress disorder
21st-century Canadian poets
Canadian male journalists
Canadian male poets
Canadian male non-fiction writers
Canadian people of Serbian descent
Serbian emigrants to Canada
Yugoslav emigrants to Canada
Naturalized citizens of Canada